Newport is a city in and the county seat of Jackson County, Arkansas, United States located on the White River  northeast of Little Rock. The population was 7,879 at the 2010 census.

Newport is home to a campus of the Arkansas State University system, with particular focus on training in transportation careers.  Newport is known as the town in which Sam Walton owned a Ben Franklin store prior to starting Wal-Mart.

Newport has ten properties listed on the National Register of Historic Places.

Geography

Climate
The climate in this area is characterized by hot, humid summers and generally mild to cool winters.  According to the Köppen Climate Classification system, Newport has a humid subtropical climate, abbreviated "Cfa" on climate maps.

Demographics

2020 census

As of the 2020 United States census, there were 8,005 people, 2,261 households, and 1,234 families residing in the city.

2000 census
As of the census of 2000, the city's residents comprised 7,811 people in 2,690 households 1,702 families. The racial makeup of the city was 56.57% White, 41.76% Black or African American, 0.27% Native American, 0.33% Asian, 0.01% Pacific Islander, 0.28% from other races, and 0.77% from two or more races.  1.13% of the population were Hispanic or Latino of any race.

There were 2,690 households, out of which 26.2% had children under the age of 18 living with them, 42.5% were married couples living together, 17.5% had a female householder with no husband present, and 36.7% were non-families. 33.2% of all households were made up of individuals, and 17.9% had someone living alone who was 65 years of age or older.  The average household size was 2.29 and the average family size was 2.90.

19.6% of the population were under the age of 18, 16.7% from 18 to 24, 24.9% from 25 to 44, 20.9% from 45 to 64, and 17.9% 65 years of age or older.  The median age was 37 years. For every 100 females, there were 84.9 males.  For every 100 females age 18 and over, there were 78.9 males.

The median income for a household in the city was $26,853, and the median per capita income was $13,867. About 23.6% of families and 28.1% of the population were below the poverty line, including 40.6% of those under age 18 and 17.5% of those age 65 or over.

Government and infrastructure
The prison houses the state's death row for women.

The United States Postal Service operates the Newport Post Office.

Economy 
Medallion Foods, snack-food producer

Education

Elementary and secondary education 
Newport is supported with public education from the Newport School District, including Newport High School.

Postsecondary education 
The main campus of the two-year community college, Arkansas State University-Newport is located here.

Notable people

Commerce
 Helen Walton, wife of Sam Walton
 Sam Walton, founder of Wal-Mart
 S. Robson Walton, John T. Walton, Jim Walton and Alice Walton, children of the Wal-Mart founder

Entertainment and literature
 Sonny Burgess, rockabilly artist and a member of Rockabilly Hall of Fame
 Elizabeth Gregg Patterson, short fiction writer
 Mary Steenburgen, Academy Award-winning actress

Politics, military, and education
 Mike Beebe, former Governor of Arkansas
 Les Eaves, member of the Arkansas House of Representatives from White County; businessman in Newport 
 Kaneaster Hodges, Jr., appointed to succeed John McClellan as United States Senator upon McClellan's death in 1977
 Paul K. Holmes III, federal judge
 Ed Madden, activist, poet, and professor at the University of South Carolina
 J. Fred Parish, Arkansas state senator from 1933 to 1937
 Admiral Charles Ray, Vice Commandant of the U.S. Coast Guard
 Martha Shoffner, Treasurer of the State of Arkansas from 2007 to 2013
 Robert L. Stanton, born and raised in Newport; he became a dentist and in 1932 the first African American to be elected to the Indiana State House on the Democratic Party ticket, serving two terms
 Dwight Tosh, member of the Arkansas House of Representatives from Jonesboro; former Newport resident and former state police officer
 Jim Wood, Arkansas State Auditor from 2003 to 2011

Sports
 Dowell Loggains, NFL offensive coordinator, New York Jets
 Julius Pruitt, played for NFL's Miami Dolphins
 Theo Young, played one season with NFL's Pittsburgh Steelers and is a college football coach

See also

Jackson County Courthouse (Arkansas)

References

External links
 City website
 W.A. Billingsly Jackson County Library
 The Newport Independent, the city's newspaper published since 1901
 Newport Economic Development Commission
 Newport Area Chamber of Commerce
 Arkansas State University-Newport
 History of Newport's Jewish community (from the Institute of Southern Jewish Life)

 
Cities in Jackson County, Arkansas
Cities in Arkansas
County seats in Arkansas